Ónodi , Ónody or Onodi is a Hungarian surname. It may refer to:

Ónodi 
  (1857–1919), Hungarian otorhinolaryngologist and surgeon 
 Eszter Ónodi (born 1973), Hungarian film and theater actress
  (born 1979), Hungarian actor
 Henrietta Ónodi (born 1974), Hungarian artistic gymnast

Ónody 
 Andor Ónody (1920–1986), Hungarian footballer 
 József Ónody (1882–1957), Hungarian freestyle swimmer

Onodi 
  (born 1957), Austrian politician

Hungarian-language surnames
Hungarian toponymic surnames